The Queensland Football Association Northern Rivers was a defunct Australian rules football competition containing four clubs based in the Northern Rivers region of New South Wales and the southern area of the Gold Coast in Queensland. The league was initially known as the Summerland Australian Football League and was established in 1984 as a New South Wales-only competition involving clubs from Ballina, Byron Bay, Goonellabah and Lismore. The competition saw several clubs from the regions of the Northern Rivers, New England and the Mid North Coast come and go between the 1990s and early 2000s. In 2010 the league allowed entry to its first Queensland-based team, Coolangatta-Tweed Heads. In 2012 the remaining clubs joined the AFL Queensland umbrella and rebranded to the QAFA (B) South.

In 2016 the name of the division was changed to Northern Rivers.

During the seasons of 2016 and 2017 the clubs also played a series of matches against clubs from the AFL North Coast for premiership points.

Former Clubs

2018 Ladder

2019 Ladder

See also

Australian rules football in New South Wales
Australian Rules football in Queensland

References

Australian rules football competitions in New South Wales
Australian rules football competitions in Queensland
Northern Rivers
Sport on the Gold Coast, Queensland